Harriet is an unincorporated community in Searcy County, Arkansas, United States. Harriet has a post office with ZIP code 72639.

The Basingers are a prominent family in the community, and are distantly related to Academy Award-winning actress Kim Basinger.

Education
Harriet is within the Searcy County School District.

Harriet had been in what was the Marshall School District. On July 1, 2004, the Marshall School District and the Leslie School District consolidated to form the Searcy County School District, with the Marshall district annexing Leslie.

References

Unincorporated communities in Searcy County, Arkansas
Unincorporated communities in Arkansas